Chionanthus pubescens is a tree in the family Oleaceae. It grows as a deciduous species and is sometimes cultivated as an ornamental tree.

Distribution and habitat
Chionanthus pubescens is native to Ecuador and Peru. Its habitat is semi-deciduous forest, often occurring on hillsides.

References

pubescens
Trees of Ecuador
Trees of Peru
Ornamental trees